Danicheh Kheyr (also Romanized as Danīcheh Kheyr; also known as Danīcheh Kheyre, Dunicheh Khair, Dūnīcheh Kheyr, and Maḩmūdābād-e Danīcheh Kheyr) is a village in Khorrami Rural District, in the Central District of Khorrambid County, Fars Province, Iran. At the 2006 census, its population was 303, in 76 families.

It is located about 5 km from Safashahr and 170 km north of Shiraz.

References 

Populated places in Khorrambid County